Danta Ramgarh Assembly constituency is one of constituencies of Rajasthan Legislative Assembly in the Sikar (Lok Sabha constituency).

Danta Ramgarh Constituency covers all voters from Danta Ramgarh tehsil excluding Losal Municipal Board, Bhagatpura, Bheema, Jana, Sangalia and Khood of ILRC Losal.

Members of the Legislative Assembly

References

See also 
 Member of the Legislative Assembly (India)

Sikar district
Assembly constituencies of Rajasthan